This is the results breakdown of the local elections held in Galicia on 22 May 2011. The following tables show detailed results in the autonomous community's most populous municipalities, sorted alphabetically.

Overall

City control
The following table lists party control in the most populous municipalities, including provincial capitals (shown in bold). Gains for a party are displayed with the cell's background shaded in that party's colour.

Municipalities

A Coruña
Population: 246,047

Ferrol
Population: 73,638

Lugo
Population: 97,635

Ourense
Population: 108,673

Pontevedra
Population: 81,981

Santiago de Compostela
Population: 94,824

Vigo
Population: 297,124

References

Galicia
2011